The Right Reverend John Reginald Weller (6 October  1880 – 26 October 1969) was an Anglican priest. He was the Bishop of the Falkland Islands from 1934–1937, and of Argentina and Eastern South America from 1937–1946.

He was educated at Bedford School and Selwyn College, Cambridge; and, after an earlier career as a tea planter,  was ordained in 1914. He served in Delhi, Waziristan, Mesopotamia and Quetta (after 1917 as a military chaplain).  He was the Superintendent of the Missions to Seamen in Melbourne and then Merseyside before his elevation to the episcopate. Returning to England, he was assistant bishop of Southwell (1946–1952), Vicar of Edwalton (1946–1949) and Rector of Holme Pierrepont (1951–1958).

References

1880 births
Anglican bishops of the Falkland Islands
Anglican missionaries in Argentina
1969 deaths
20th-century Anglican bishops in South America
Alumni of Selwyn College, Cambridge
Royal Army Chaplains' Department officers
People educated at Bedford School
English Anglican missionaries
World War I chaplains
British Army personnel of World War I
Anglican bishops of Argentina